West Tennessee National Wildlife Refuge Complex is a National Wildlife Refuge complex in the state of Tennessee.

Refuges within the complex
Chickasaw National Wildlife Refuge
Lake Isom National Wildlife Refuge
Lower Hatchie National Wildlife Refuge
Reelfoot National Wildlife Refuge

References
Complex website

National Wildlife Refuges in Tennessee